Pylon Peak is the southernmost of six named volcanic peaks comprising the Mount Meager massif in British Columbia, Canada. Two pinnacled ridges extend from Pylon and are named respectively the Pylons and the Marionettes. Pylon Peak overlooks the Meager Creek Hot Springs.

Erosional remnants of flows from Devastator Peak form the stratified crags of Pylon Peak. These flows occurred 0.5–1.0 million years ago.

See also
 Cascade Volcanoes
 Garibaldi Volcanic Belt
 Volcanism of Canada
 Volcanism of Western Canada
 List of volcanoes in Canada

References

Volcanoes of British Columbia
Two-thousanders of British Columbia
Mount Meager massif
Subduction volcanoes
Stratovolcanoes of Canada
Pliocene volcanoes
Pleistocene stratovolcanoes